The Presque Isle Downs Masters Stakes is a Grade II American Thoroughbred horse race for fillies and mares that are three years old or older, over a distance of  furlongs on the all weather track held annually in September at Presque Isle Downs & Casino racetrack in Summit Township, Erie County, Pennsylvania, United States.  The event currently carries a purse of $400,000.

History 
The race was inaugurated in 2007 with an attractive purse offered of $400,000 over the distance of six furlongs. The distance of the event was increased to  furlongs in 2009.
That same year, 2009, the event was upgraded to a Grade III and two years later in 2011 to a Grade II.

The event has become the highlight of the meet and attracts fine fillies and mares from Canada and USA including dual winner of the event Informed Decision who later won the 2009 Breeders' Cup Filly & Mare Sprint, and Groupie Doll won the Breeders' Cup Filly & Mare Sprint in 2012 and 2013. 

The event was not held in 2020 and 2021 due to the COVID-19 pandemic in the United States.

Records
Speed record: 
  furlongs – 1:14.68   - Ami's Mesa  (2017)
  6 furlongs: 1:07:95 - Wild Gams (2008)

Margins: 
  lengths – Hotshot Anna  (2018)

Most wins by a jockey  
 2 – Julien R. Leparoux  (2009, 2010)
 2 – Rajiv Maragh  (2012, 2013)
 2 – Antonio A. Gallardo  (2018, 2019)

Most wins by a trainer
 2 – Jonathan E. Sheppard  (2009, 2010)
 2 – William B. Bradley   (2012, 2013)
 2 – Gary Mandella   (2014, 2015)
 2 – Hugh H. Robertson   (2018, 2019)

Winners 

Legend:

 

Notes:

*In 2022 Artie's Princess finished first, but was later disqualified due to a medication violation. The connections plan to appeal the ruling. Artie's Princess' final time of 1:14.57 would have been a stakes record.

See also
List of American and Canadian Graded races

References 

Graded stakes races in the United States
Horse races in Pennsylvania
Grade 2 stakes races in the United States
Recurring sporting events established in 2007
2007 establishments in Pennsylvania
Sprint category horse races for fillies and mares